J.J. Michel Robert,  (born January 29, 1938) is a Canadian jurist and former  politician from Quebec.

Robert served as president of the Young Liberals of Canada from 1963 to 1965, and was a member of the 1982 to 1985 Royal Commission on the Economic Union and Development Prospects for Canada headed by Donald Stovel Macdonald. 
From 1986 to 1990, he was president of the Liberal Party of Canada. In 1991, he was appointed to the Queen's Privy Council for Canada when  Prime Minister Brian Mulroney appointed him to the Security Intelligence Review Committee.

Robert's legal career began with his admission to the Bar of Quebec in 1962. He was  senior partner in the firm of Robert Dansereau, Barred, Marchessault and Lauzon, Montreal from 1968 to 1990 and in private practice with Langlois Robert from 1990 to 1995.

In 1995, he was appointed a puisne justice on the Quebec Court of Appeal, and became chief justice in 2002. He retired in 2011.

In 2013, he was made an Officer of the Order of Canada "for his achievements in the field of law as a lawyer and jurist, and for his commitment to advancing his profession".

References

1938 births
Judges in Quebec
Canadian King's Counsel
Members of the King's Privy Council for Canada
Living people
Officers of the Order of Canada
Presidents of the Liberal Party of Canada